Irfan Adelbi (born 15 December 1945) is a Jordanian shooter. He competed in the 1984 Summer Olympics. Adelbi was placed 65th in the mixed trap event with 149 points.

References

1945 births
Living people
Shooters at the 1984 Summer Olympics
Jordanian male sport shooters
Olympic shooters of Jordan